"Love Is Stronger Than Pride" is a song by English band Sade from their third studio album, Stronger Than Pride (1988). It was released as the album's lead single on 21 March 1988. The song was a top 10 hit in Finland and Italy, and entered the top 20 in Belgium, the Netherlands and South Africa. In the UK, it peaked at number 44.

Reception
Sophie Heawood of The Guardian commented, "Seemingly composed entirely from air currents and fragments of Spanish guitar, the lead single from the 1988 album of the same name showed Sade at their most minimal". James Hamilton from Record Mirror wrote in his dance column, "Resonantly atmospheric pulsing though not very rhythmic -0bpm smoky slow vocal swayer". Frank Guan of Vulture said, "There's a bit of an in-joke in the title track of Sade's third album: prior to renaming itself after, and reorganizing itself around its lead singer, the band had played under the name of Pride. Complete the equation and you'll discover that Sade is, in fact, Love, a fact amply borne out by the song itself."

Track listings
 7-inch single
A. "Love Is Stronger Than Pride" – 4:18
B. "Super Bien Total" – 4:02

 12-inch single
A. "Love Is Stronger Than Pride" – 4:18
B. "Super Bien Total" (extended mix) – 6:52

 UK and European CD single
Austrian 3-inch CD single
"Love Is Stronger Than Pride" – 4:18
"Super Bien Total" (extended mix) – 6:52

 US cassette single
"Love Is Stronger Than Pride" – 4:18
"Make Some Room" – 4:16

Charts

References

1980s ballads
1988 singles
1988 songs
Epic Records singles
Music videos directed by Sophie Muller
Sade (band) songs
Song recordings produced by Mike Pela
Songs written by Sade (singer)
Songs written by Stuart Matthewman